Adrenochrome is a chemical compound produced by the oxidation of adrenaline (epinephrine). It was the subject of limited research from the 1950s through to the 1970s as a potential cause of schizophrenia. While it has no current medical application, the related derivative compound, carbazochrome, is a hemostatic medication. Despite this compound's name, it is unrelated to the element chromium; instead, the ‑chrome suffix indicates a relationship to color, as pure adrenochrome is deep violet.

Chemistry 
The oxidation reaction that converts adrenaline into adrenochrome occurs both in vivo and in vitro. In vitro,  silver oxide (Ag2O) is used. In solution, adrenochrome is pink and further oxidation of the compound causes it to polymerize into brown or black melanin compounds.

History 
Several small-scale studies (involving 15 or fewer test subjects) conducted in the 1950s and 1960s reported that adrenochrome triggered psychotic reactions such as thought disorder and derealization.

In 1954, researchers Abram Hoffer and Humphry Osmond claimed that adrenochrome is a neurotoxic, psychotomimetic substance and may play a role in schizophrenia and other mental illnesses.

In what Hoffer called the "adrenochrome hypothesis", he and Osmond in 1967 speculated that megadoses of vitamin C and niacin could cure schizophrenia by reducing brain adrenochrome.

The treatment of schizophrenia with such potent anti-oxidants is highly contested. In 1973, the American Psychiatric Association reported methodological flaws in Hoffer's work on niacin as a schizophrenia treatment and referred to follow-up studies that did not confirm any benefits of the treatment. Multiple additional studies in the United States, Canada, and Australia similarly failed to find benefits of megavitamin therapy to treat schizophrenia.

The adrenochrome theory of schizophrenia waned, despite some evidence that it may be psychotomimetic, as adrenochrome was not detectable in people with schizophrenia.

In the early 2000s, interest was renewed by the discovery that adrenochrome may be produced normally as an intermediate in the formation of neuromelanin. This finding may be significant because adrenochrome is detoxified at least partially by glutathione-S-transferase. Some studies have found genetic defects in the gene for this enzyme.

In popular culture 
 In his 1954 book The Doors of Perception, Aldous Huxley mentioned the discovery and the alleged effects of adrenochrome which he likened to the symptoms of mescaline intoxication, although he had never consumed it.
 Anthony Burgess mentions adrenochrome as "drencrom" at the beginning of his 1962 novel A Clockwork Orange. The protagonist and his friends are drinking drug-laced milk: "They had no license for selling liquor, but there was no law yet against prodding some of the new veshches which they used to put into the old moloko, so you could peet it with vellocet or synthemesc or drencrom or one or two other veshches [...]"
 Hunter S. Thompson mentioned adrenochrome in his 1971 book Fear and Loathing in Las Vegas. This is the likely origin of current myths surrounding this compound, because a character states that "There's only one source for this stuff... the adrenaline glands from a living human body. It's no good if you get it out of a corpse." The adrenochrome scene also appears in the novel's film adaptation. In the DVD commentary, director Terry Gilliam admits that his and Thompson's portrayal is a fictional exaggeration. Gilliam insists that the drug is entirely fictional and seems unaware of the existence of a substance with the same name.  Hunter S. Thompson also mentions adrenochrome in his book Fear and Loathing on the Campaign Trail '72. In the footnotes in chapter April, page 140, he says: "It was sometime after midnight in a ratty hotel room and my memory of the conversation is hazy, due to massive ingestion of booze, fatback, and forty cc's of adrenochrome."
 Adrenochrome is a component of several conspiracy theories, such as QAnon and Pizzagate, with the chemical helping the theories play a similar role to earlier blood libel and satanic ritual abuse stories. According to QAnon, which has incorporated and expanded Pizzagate's claims about child sex abuse rings, a cabal of Satanists that rapes and murders children, using the adrenochrome they "harvest" from their victims' blood as a drug or as an elixir of youth. In reality, adrenochrome can be synthesized, and can be acquired for research purposes by biotechnology companies.

References

External links 
 Adrenochrome Commentary at erowid.org
 Adrenochrome deposits resulting from the use of epinephrine-containing eye drops used to treat glaucoma from the Iowa Eye Atlas (searched for diagnosis = adrenochrome)

Secondary alcohols
Indolequinones